Rigelj (also Rigelj na Rogu) is a remote abandoned settlement in the Municipality of Kočevje in southern Slovenia. The area is part of the traditional region of Lower Carniola and is now included in the Southeast Slovenia Statistical Region. Its territory is now part of the village of Stari Breg.

History
Rigelj was a Gottschee German village. Before the Second World War the settlement had eight houses. Italian troops burned the area in the summer of 1942 during the Rog Offensive and the settlement was not rebuilt.

References

External links
Rigelj on Geopedia
Pre–World War II list of oeconyms and family names in Rigelj

Former populated places in the Municipality of Kočevje